Scatterbrain (Will Deguchi) is a fictional character, a superhero in the Marvel Universe, member of the Strikeforce: Morituri. The character was created by Peter B. Gillis and Brent Anderson.

Publication history
Scatterbrain (Will Deguchi) was created by writer Peter B. Gillis and artist Brent Anderson and debuted in Strikeforce: Morituri #6 (May 1987). The codename "Scatterbrain" was introduced in issue #8, in which he also joined the title cast of Strikeforce: Morituri. Scatterbrain remained in the regular cast of the book until his incapacitation in issue #18. He finally died in issue #24, the last character of the series to die of the infamous "Morituri effect". Subsequent issues saw appearances of what appeared to be his ghost, until, in the Strikeforce: Morituri: Electric Undertow miniseries, it was revealed to be a sentient artificial intelligence modelled after the late Scatterbrain. The character's surname and design indicates that he is at least partially of Japanese origin.

Fictional character biography
Almost nothing is known of Will Deguchi's life prior to his decision to join Strikeforce: Morituri. Apparently, at a young age, possibly as a child, he experienced a devastating earthquake in Missouri, an experience he used years later to telepathically project it in battle. In 2073, the young Deguchi decided to volunteer for the Morituri program, hoping to assist in the ongoing war of Earth against the alien invaders known as the Horde. The aforementioned program granted superhuman powers to ordinary humans, in turn transforming them into super-powered soldiers against the Horde. However, the process came at a terrible price, a fatal flaw which ensured that its recipients would die within a year of receiving the process, due to the unstable nature of this "transformation".

Nevertheless, after proving genetically compatible for the process, Deguchi decided to undergo it. Deguchi was the last of the so-called second generation of Morituri to go through the process, preceded by Toxyn and Scaredycat. After going through the process, Deguchi, like most Morituri, was instructed to participate in a test in the booby-trapped Biowar Facility Alpha (nicknamed "the Garden"), so that his powers would burst forth under extreme pressure and stress. However, Deguchi almost died in the process of facing the deadly traps of the test environment. He was eventually saved by the doctors of the Morituri program, although his left leg was irretrievably damaged. Feeling guilty for him, the inventor of the Morituri process and the Garden facility, Dr. Kimmo Tuolema, designed a leg brace for Deguchi, which became a permanent part of his. Having now developed the ability to project emotions, but in a rather unfocused manner and across groups of people, Deguchi was given the humorous codename "Scatterbrain" by his teammate, Pilar Lysieux, in turn giving her the codename "Scaredycat", because of her ability to induce panic and fear to others. The three Morituri soon met with their senior members and participated in their first official battle.

Later, thanks to the data that fellow member Adept had accumulated from a mission of the team in the Horde fleet in outer space, special boots that enabled flight were designed and handed out to the Morituri. Thanks to the flight boots, an enthusiastic Scatterbrain overcame any kinetic problems posed by his smashed leg.

Initially, Scatterbrain could only transmit psychological conditions, ranging from drunkenness and sobriety to fear and nausea, albeit in an unfocused manner, often affecting his own teammates if they were in the vicinity, against his own will. Over time, his control over his power increased and it became more sophisticated. His telepathy grew to the point he was now also able to sense the emotions and read the minds of his fellow Morituri.

Power boost
Months later, during a battle against the super-powered Super Hordians seemed to have their match. Simultaneously, a new batch of Morituri were going through the process, albeit without the supervision of Dr. Tuolema. The carelessness of the scientists' team during the process led to the four new volunteers being transformed into enormities. One of the horribly disfigured Morituri, on his despair, manifested a telepathic ability that enabled him to connect to the other Morituri. In agony, the new Morituri reached out to fellow Morituri - and telepath - Scatterbrain, and through him, unleashed a powerful psychic blast that slew all the Super Hordians.

The team realized that something was horribly wrong and they visited the Morituri base, where they witnessed the results of the operators' carelessness. Scatterbrain telepathically interrogated the chief operator and realized that it didn't matter to him what they had done and they would be willing to do it again, regardless of the sacrifice. Repulsed by the stance of the operator, Scatterbrain incapacitated. With the Horde launching an attack against the Morituri base, Scatterbrain felt like they were working monsters - the Paedia World Government - and suggested to his teammates they do nothing and just die all together in the hands of the Horde, like they deserved. However, the new Morituri decided to help them and the telepathic one among them temporarily used Scatterbrain as a vessel to announce their decision. After Scatterbrain's powers vanquished the Hordians, fellow member Silencer euthanized the monstrous Morituri, relieving them from their misery.

Coma and death
Following this incident, Scatterbrain grew increasingly obsessed with death and what lay beyond it. Furthermore, his mental connection with the telepathic Morituri had left his powers significantly enhanced; he could focus his powers, but could not stop himself from sensing every thought and emotion of the others, mentally "hearing" everything. Around the same time, Scaredycat started making romantic advances towards him and the two began forming a romance. However, now manifesting clairsentience, Scatterbrain foresaw that she would be the next one to die of the Morituri effect, and informed her of the fact, which she faced quite stoically. Shortly afterwards, the Morituri faced some Hordians and killed one of their highest warlords. Scatterbrain locked into the dying alien's mind, longing to see what awaited him after death. Seeing only darkness and pain, an agonizing Scatterbrain lashed out with his psychic powers and inadvertently killed the remaining Hordians. However, the traumatic experience also caused him to withdraw into a self-induced coma.

For the next few months, Scatterbrain remained in coma, until he died peacefully, never waking from his coma, having almost exhausted the one-year limit of the Morituri effect. He was the last member of his generation to die.

Artificial intelligence
In the same morning that Scatterbrain died, new team member Scanner was visited in his dreams by what appeared to be Scatterbrain. "Scatterbrain" warned him of the "new ones" (the alien race known as VXX199), the conspiracy of the corrupt politician Andre Lemont, and his teammate Shear. When Scanner woke up, he checked on the comatose Scatterbrain, only to discover he had just died of the Morituri effect that morning. All of Scatterbrain's warnings proved correct. Later, while being unconscious, Scanner was again visited in his dreams by Scatterbrain, who reiterated his warnings.

Ten years after the conspiracy was revealed, Scanner was again visited by the ghost of the late Scatterbrain, who warned him of the VXX199 and their subtle efforts to take over the word. Eventually, this new "Scatterbrain" revealed he was an artificial intelligence, which had been developed by the United States of America in late 20th century, for military purposes. The then rival of USA, the Soviet Union, tried to erase the A.I. with a virus, but failed, only making it stronger, as it grew to become a sentient entity. The A.I. then took over world communications and began influencing global developments, spreading false information or appointing certain politicians. The A.I. essentially pulled the strings that led to the formation of a World Government and, after the war with the Horde started, the formation of Morituri. The A.I. was controlling powerful politician Lamont, until he began being influenced by a mysterious outside source.

Wishing to investigate, the A.I. entered the comatose Scatterbrain's mind through a bio-chip implant in his brain and copied his powers and personality. With Scatterbrain's psychic powers, the A.I. reached space and discovered about the nefarious plans of the seemingly benevolent alien race of the VXX199. The A.I. created a construct-personality program from Scatterbrain's memories and entered Scanner's dreams, through Scanner's own bio-chip implant in the brain, where he proceeded to warn him, while posing as Scatterbrain. Calling himself "Will", from the last Will Deguchi, the A.I. helped Scanner and the other surviving Morituri to destroy the VXXX199, although it also warned them of new perils waiting in the future.

References

Comics characters introduced in 1987
Marvel Comics male superheroes
Marvel Comics superheroes
Marvel Comics telepaths
Strikeforce: Morituri